There have been fifteen prime ministers of Sri Lanka since the creation of the position in 1947, prior to the independence of Ceylon. The prime minister of Ceylon was the head of the government until 1972. In 1972, the country was renamed as the Free, Sovereign and Independent Republic of Sri Lanka, and the position was known as the prime minister of Sri Lanka from then onwards. The prime minister also held the unified Ministry of External Affairs and Defence until 1977, when the government of J.R. Jayewardene split the ministry into two ministries, forming the Ministry of Defence and the Ministry of Foreign Affairs.

In 1978, after Jayewardene became the president, new constitutional changes were introduced. The position of the executive president was introduced, resulting in the powers of the prime minister being reduced. The president became the head of state and chief executive, and the prime minister became a weak head of government.

Under the current constitution of Sri Lanka, the prime minister is the leader of the Cabinet business and also functions as a deputy to the president. In the event a president dies in office, the prime minister becomes the acting president until the Parliament convenes to elect a successor or new elections can be held to elect a new president. Such was the case in 1993, when President Ranasinghe Premadasa was assassinated and Prime Minister Dingiri Banda Wijetunga took office as president.

On 28 April 2015, the Parliament approved the 19th Amendment to the Constitution of Sri Lanka which gives the power of the government to the prime minister, while the president remains the head of state, head of the Cabinet, and commander-in-chief.

Of the fourteen prime ministers who have held the office since the introduction of the position in 1947, one has held the office four times, two have held office thrice, and two have held office twice. Six prime ministers have gone on to become president of the country.

Ranil Wickremesinghe has been sworn in as prime minister the most times in the country's history, on six occasions (May 1993, December 2001, January 2015, August 2015, December 2018, and May 2022), whilst Dudley Shelton Senanayaka and Sirimavo Bandaranayake were appointed three times. Mahinda Rajapaksa is the only prime minister who was suspended from his duties by the Supreme Court, becoming the first de facto prime minister of Sri Lanka in 2018.

List of prime ministers

Parties
 (7)
 (7)
 (1)
 (1)

Timeline

See also

 List of presidents of Sri Lanka
 Prime Minister's Office (Sri Lanka)

Notes

 The Parliament was known as the "House of Representatives" during the period of 1947–1972
 In 1972, the country was named "Free, Sovereign and Independent Republic of Sri Lanka", and the Parliament was named as the National State Assembly.
 Under the constitutional changes of 1978, the country was renamed as the "Democratic Socialist Republic of Sri Lanka", and the Parliament was referred to as "Parliament of the Democratic Socialist Republic of Sri Lanka".

References
General

 "Former Prime Ministers" (.html). Official Website of the Government of Sri Lanka. Retrieved 2008-10-04. 
 "Handbook of Parliament - Prime Ministers" (.jsp). The Parliament of Sri Lanka. Retrieved 2008-10-04. 
 "PMs of Sri Lanka" (.htm). Prime Minister's Office. Retrieved 2008-10-05.

Specific

Sri Lanka, Prime Ministers
Prime Minister
List
Prime Ministers